Plover is a village in Portage County, Wisconsin, United States. A suburb of Stevens Point, it is part of the Stevens Point Micropolitan Statistical Area. The population was 13,519 at the 2020 United States census.

History
An 1825 treaty establishes a "Plover Portage of the Ouisconsin" as a boundary point between the Chippewa and Winnebago

The area that later became Plover was selected as the county seat of Portage in 1844. The election for the county seat only noted the general location of an unsettled area around present-day Plover. Until the area was settled, county business was actually conducted in the community of Rushville. The Plover area was platted in 1845, and received a post office at the same time under the name "Plover Portage". The name of the post office was changed to "Plover" in 1850.

In 1857, State Senator Luther Hanchett of Plover introduced a bill to incorporate the Village of Clayton in the community; he later amended the bill to make the name the Village of Algernon. That bill passed the Wisconsin Legislature, incorporating the Village of Algernon on March 6, 1857. (Algernon was probably named for Algernon B. Crosby, a postmaster in Portage County.) On May 4, 1858, the name of the village was again changed, this time to the Village of Stanton. And in 1864, the name of the village was finally changed to Plover.

In 1868, the county seat was moved to Stevens Point, following an energetic battle in newspapers and the state legislature. The village of Plover was dissolved, and government of the area fell to the Town of Plover.

Plover was again incorporated as a village on March 8, 1912 after area residents' approval in an election. This incorporation was not long lived, as Plover was again dissolved on October 7, 1931 after another election. An attempt at re-incorporation failed in 1965.

Plover re-incorporated, for the third time, on September 28, 1971. The vote for incorporation was narrow: 311 for and 289 against. The population of the village at that time was 2618. Annexations continued nearly every year until the present.

The village president is Tom Davies, who was first elected in 2015.

Geography

Demographics

2020 census
As of the census of 2020, the population was 13,519. The racial makeup of the village was 86.8% White, 5.0% Asian, 1.3% Black or African American, 0.3% Native American, 1.7% from other races, and 4.9% from two or more races. Ethnically, the population was 5.1% Hispanic or Latino of any race.

2010 census
As of the census of 2010, there were 12,123 people, 4,948 households, and 3,242 families living in the village. The racial makeup of the village was 92.8% White, 0.5% African American, 0.4% Native American, 3.8% Asian, 1.0% from other races, and 1.5% from two or more races. Hispanic or Latino of any race were 3.2% of the population.

There were 4,948 households, of which 32.7% had children under the age of 18 living with them, 52.8% were married couples living together, 9.0% had a female householder with no husband present, 3.7% had a male householder with no wife present, and 34.5% were non-families. 26.4% of all households were made up of individuals, and 8.5% had someone living alone who was 65 years of age or older. The average household size was 2.44 and the average family size was 2.99.

The median age in the village was 35.9 years. 25.3% of residents were under the age of 18; 9% were between the ages of 18 and 24; 27.2% were from 25 to 44; 27.5% were from 45 to 64; and 11% were 65 years of age or older. The gender makeup of the village was 49.1% male and 50.9% female.

2000 census
As of the census of 2000, there were 10,520 people, 3,985 households, and 2,845 families living in the village. The population density was 1,238.2 people per square mile (477.9/km2). There were 4,133 housing units at an average density of 486.5 per square mile (187.7/km2). The racial makeup of the village was 96.82% White, 0.43% Black or African American, 0.42% Native American, 0.95% Asian, 0.04% Pacific Islander, 0.41% from other races, and 0.94% from two or more races. 1.35% of the population were Hispanic or Latino of any race.

There were 3,985 households, out of which 39.5% had children under the age of 18 living with them, 59.9% were married couples living together, 8.4% had a female householder with no husband present, and 28.6% were non-families. 20.8% of all households were made up of individuals, and 4.6% had someone living alone who was 65 years of age or older. The average household size was 2.63 and the average family size was 3.11.

In the village, the population was spread out, with 28.8% under the age of 18, 9.8% from 18 to 24, 32.1% from 25 to 44, 22.9% from 45 to 64, and 6.5% who were 65 years of age or older. The median age was 33 years. For every 100 females, there were 98.4 males. For every 100 females age 18 and over, there were 97.0 males.

The median income for a household in the village was $51,238, and the median income for a family was $60,146. Males had a median income of $40,206 versus $26,521 for females. The per capita income for the village was $23,085. About 4.2% of families and 6.0% of the population were below the poverty line, including 8.0% of those under age 18 and 4.3% of those age 65 or over.

Religion

Saint Bronislava Catholic Church, Woodlands Church, and Divine Word Lutheran Church, affiliated with the Wisconsin Evangelical Lutheran Synod (WELS), are in Plover.

Notable people

 James S. Alban, Wisconsin State Senator
 Dennis Hall, world champion wrestler, Olympic medalist, Pan American Games gold medalist
 Harley M. Jacklin, Wisconsin State Senator
 Robert Lampman, economist
 Alexander S. McDill, United States representative
 Joe Pavelski, NHL player, Dallas Stars
 Clayton K. Slack, Medal of Honor
 Walt Wilmot, baseball player, stole 76 bases in one season for 1890 Chicago Cubs

References

External links
 Plover, Wisconsin
 Plover Area Business Association

Villages in Portage County, Wisconsin
Villages in Wisconsin